Hildor Arnold Barton (November 30, 1929 – September 28, 2016) was an American historian and a national authority on Scandinavian history, especially the history of Sweden, and of Swedes and other Scandinavians in North America.

Early life
Barton was born of Swedish descent in Los Angeles, California in 1929, the son of Sven Hildor Barton (1892–1972) and Marguerite Anna née Lemke (1901–1983). His paternal grandfather was born in Djursdala parish, Kalmar, Småland county, Sweden and emigrated to America in 1867. His paternal grandmother was born in Bollnäs parish, Hälsingland county and emigrated to America in 1889. His mother was a niece of Harry Edward Arnhold.

Career 
Barton received his B.A. degree at Pomona College and his doctorate at Princeton University. Arnold Barton taught history at the University of Alberta, Edmonton, Alberta, Canada (1960 to 1963) and at the University of California, Santa Barbara  (1963 to 1970). He taught at Southern Illinois University, Carbondale, Illinois, where he became professor in 1975 and from where he retired in 1996 as professor emeritus of history.

After retiring he moved to Sweden.

His research and writing covers a broad register, including Scandinavia in the era of the French Revolutionary-Napoleonic era, relations between homeland Swedes and Swedish Americans, and the Norwegian-Swedish union of 1814-1905. Barton has served on the boards of the Swedish-American Historical Society and the Swenson Swedish Immigration Research Center.
Between 1974 and 1990, Barton served as editor of the Swedish-American Historical Quarterly.

Honors and recognition 
In 1985, Professor H. Arnold Barton was awarded the Charlotta Medal in recognition of his contributions to the Swedish Emigrant Institute at Växjö, Småland, Sweden. 
Barton was named "Swedish-American of the Year" in 1988 by the Royal Swedish Ministry of Foreign Affairs and by the two Swedish District lodges of the Vasa Order of America. In 1989, he was granted an honorary doctorate from Uppsala University, Sweden. In 2000,  he was made Knight-Commander of the Royal Swedish Order of the Polar Star by King Carl XVI Gustaf of Sweden. In 2012 he received the Swedish Council of America's Great Achievement Award.

Death 
He died on September 28, 2016 in Stockholm, Sweden.

Selected bibliography

 Count Hans Axel von Fersen: Aristocrat in an Age of Revolution  (1975)
 Letters from the Promised Land: Swedes in America, 1840-1914  (1975)
 The Search for Ancestors: A Swedish-American Family Saga  (1979)
 Scandinavia in the Revolutionary Era, 1760-1815  (1986)
 A Folk Divided: Homeland Swedes and Swedish Americans, 1840-1940  (1994)
 Northern Arcadia: Foreign Travelers in Scandinavia, 1765-1815  (1998)
 Sweden and Visions of Norway: Politics and Culture, 1814-1905  (2003)
 The Old Country and the New: Essays on Swedes and America  (2006)
 Essays on Scandinavian History  (2009)

See also
Society for the Advancement of Scandinavian Study

References

External links
Vasa Order of America
Swedish-American Historic Society

Historians of Europe
Scandinavian studies scholars
1929 births
2016 deaths
University of California, Santa Barbara faculty
Southern Illinois University faculty
Society for the Advancement of Scandinavian Study
Pomona College alumni
Princeton University alumni
American people of Swedish descent
American expatriates in Sweden

Commanders of the Order of the Polar Star
Writers from Los Angeles
20th-century American educators
20th-century American non-fiction writers
21st-century American non-fiction writers
Historians from California